Wangjiazhuang Station is an interchange station between Line 10 and International Expo Branch of Line 6 of Chongqing Rail Transit in Chongqing municipality, China. It is located in Yubei District and opened in 2017.

Station structure
A cross-platform interchange is provided between Line 6 (International Expo branch) and Line 10.

References

Railway stations in Chongqing
Railway stations in China opened in 2017
Chongqing Rail Transit stations